Robert Andrew MacDonald (July 16, 1912 – May 12, 1989) was an American special effects artist who won two Academy Awards.

Oscar nominations
All three nominations were in the category of Best Special Effects.

32nd Academy Awards-Ben-Hur, shared with A. Arnold Gillespie and Milo B. Lory. Won.
35th Academy Awards-The Longest Day, shared with Jacques Maumont. Won.
18th Academy Awards-Nominated for They Were Expendable. Nomination shared with A. Arnold Gillespie, Donald Jahraus and Michael Steinore. Lost to Wonder Man

Selected filmography

Enemy Mine (1985)
Gremlins (1984)
Superman (1978)
Ryan's Daughter (1970)
The Charge of the Light Brigade (1968)
Is Paris Burning? (1966)
What's New Pussycat? (1965)
The Longest Day (1962)
Ben Hur (1959)

References

External links

Best Visual Effects Academy Award winners
Special effects people
1912 births
1989 deaths
People from California